Gwak Hyeon-chae (born 20 July 1947) is a South Korean basketball player. He competed in the men's tournament at the 1968 Summer Olympics.

References

External links
 

1947 births
Living people
South Korean men's basketball players
1970 FIBA World Championship players
Olympic basketball players of South Korea
Basketball players at the 1968 Summer Olympics
People from Yeosu
Asian Games medalists in basketball
Basketball players at the 1970 Asian Games
Basketball players at the 1974 Asian Games
Asian Games gold medalists for South Korea
Asian Games silver medalists for South Korea
Medalists at the 1970 Asian Games
Medalists at the 1974 Asian Games
Sportspeople from South Jeolla Province
20th-century South Korean people
21st-century South Korean people